Luzula campestris, commonly known as field wood-rush, Good Friday grass or sweep's brush is a flowering plant in the rush family Juncaceae. It is a very common plant throughout temperate Europe extending to the Caucasus. This species of Luzula is found on all types of native grasslands, and cultivated areas such as lawns, golf-course greens and fields.

Description

It spreads via short stolons and also via seed produced in one stemless cluster of flowers together with three to six stemmed clusters of flowers.

It flowers between March and June in the northern temperate zone (September to December in the southern hemisphere).  The chromosome number is 12, 24 or 36.

The plant can be a persistent weed in ornamental turf.

Distribution
The native range of Luzula campestris is temperate Europe, extending to North Africa in the south and to the Caucasus in the east. The species has a northern limit at about latitude 63 degrees north in Scandinavia.  
The closely related Luzula multiflora is native in much of North America, and is a distinct species in the Flora of North America. Some botanists treat it as a variety, Luzula campestris var. multiflora.

Luzula campestris has been introduced worldwide outside its native range, into suitable habitats in the southern hemisphere.

References

External links

campestris
Flora of Asia
Flora of Europe
Flora of Germany
Flora of Poland
Plants described in 1753
Taxa named by Carl Linnaeus